The following is a list of compositions by the Czech composer, Otto Albert Tichy.

Chorus

Cantatas and Mass settings
Kyrie and Gloria (20) for mixed choir a capella 
Nativité (43)
Narozeni Páně (Lord's born) - Christmas cantata for soli, choir, organ and orchestra 
Missa in honorem Sancti Aloisii (44) for four-voice mixed choir a capella 
Missa en l‘ honeur de St. Louis de Gonzague (46) for four-voice mixed choir a capella issued in Geneva
Missa in honorem Sancti Amedei (48) for four-voice male choir a capella 
Cantate pour premiere messe (55) soli, mixed choir, organ
Saint Vitus (111) soli, mixed choir, organ (probably motet) 
Kyrie (117) for four-voice mixed choir a capella 
Missa festival in honorem Sti Alberti Magni (140) for four-voice mixed choir a capella 
Missa in honorem Sti Adalberti (152) for four-voice mixed choir a capella 
Missa pastoralis in honorem Jesu Infantis in Praga (166) for four-voice mixed choir and organ
Missa pastoralis in honorem Jesu Infantis in Praga (166b) orchestral version (partiture and voices) 
Dětská vánoční mše (Children Christmas Mass)(171b)
festive mass for the honour and praise Jesus Christ the King
Missa brevis (201) for four-voice mixed choir a capella (separate voices) 
Jezu Kriste příteli – svatý Jene Křtiteli (204) (Jesus Christ the friend - Saint John the Baptist) for four-voice mixed choir and organ
Missa de quadragessime (Mše in C) (222) for three to four voice mixed choir a capella
Missa without Credo 
Missa in honorem Beatae Mariae Virginae in coelum Assumptae (225) in the archive of St. Vitus Cathedral in Prague

Songs – Czech mass ordinarium (259)
festival liturgie in Czech
Gloria in excelsis Deo (289)
Christmas cantata, pastoral mass for soli, choir, organ and orchestra on the words of F. Rejl 
To the Czech country (314), cantata with two melodramas
Smíšené sbory, Chant de jeunesse catolique for mixed choir with piano
Svatý Václave (Saint Wencslas)(28) for tenor, bass, choir and piano (organ) adaptation of chant from the 13th century

1922
Ave Maria (33b)

fis moll

for four-voices mixed choir a capella

Tu es Petrus (35)

moteto pro čtyřhlasý smíšený sbor a capella

Sub tuum praesidium (36)

moteto pro čtyřhlasý smíšený sbor a capella

Tantum ergo a Postula a me (52)

dva čtyřhlasé smíšené sbory s doprovodem varhan

A Notre-Dame du Chene (54)

chvalozpěv pro sóla, smíšený sbor a varhany

De profundis (56)

pro čtyřhlasý smíšený sbor a capella

Tu es Petrus (61)

moteto pro čtyřhlasý smíšený sbor a varhany

Jubilate Deo (64)

moteto pro čtyřhlasý smíšený sbor a capella

vyšla v Praporci roku 1950

Petit Antoine est mort (65)

píseň pro sóla, sbor a klavír

Tu es Petrus (66)

moteto pro čtyřhlasý smíšený sbor a capella

O quam suavis (66)

moteto pro čtyřhlasý smíšený sbor a capella

L‘hymne a Céphas (67)

pro dvě sóla a čtyřhlasý smíšený sbor a capella

Pange lingua (68)

pro čtyřhlasý smíšený sbor a capella

Perfice gressus meos (72)

moteto pro čtyřhlasý smíšený sbor a capella

L‘Orayson a Nostre Dame (82)

Modlitba k Panně Marii

pro sóla, smíšený sbor a varhany

La Nuit: Rondeau (90)

pro čtyřhlasý smíšený sbor a capella

Ave Maria (93)

pro čtyřhlasý smíšený sbor a varhany

Ave Maria (93)

pro čtyřhlasý smíšený sbor a varhany

La paix soit avec vous (94)

Pokoj buď s Vámi

pro sóla, smíšený sbor a varhany

Tantum ergo sacramentum (96)

pro čtyřhlasý smíšený sbor a varhany

Tantum ergo sacramentum (96)

pro čtyřhlasý smíšený sbor a varhany

Sacerdos et Pontifex (98)

pro čtyřhlasý smíšený sbor

Benedicite gentes (107)

pro tenor sólo, sbor a varhany

Gloria et honore (112)

Offertorium in festo Sti Venceslai

moteto pro čtyřhlasý smíšený sbor a varhany

Salut – IV. Tantum ergo (113)

pro čtyřhlasý smíšený sbor a capella

Tui sunt coeli (114)

moteto na Hod Boží vánoční pro čtyřhlasý smíšený sbor a varhany

Vy pastýřové stávéte (115)

hanácká koleda – úprava pro sedmihlasý smíšený sbor a capella

Tři Králové (116)

podle staré francouzské koledy pro čtyřhlasý smíšený sbor

Ave, anima piisima! (121)

pro čtyřhlasý smíšený sbor a capella

1936

Zdrávas, Hvězdo mořská (109)

pro sbor unisono a varhany

Přivedeny budou (128)

moteto pro tři ženské hlasy a capella

1939

K blahoslavené Zdislavě (125)

pro čtyřhlasý smíšený sbor a capella

Beatus vir (129)

moteto pro čtyřhlasý smíšený sbor a varhany

Confirma hoc, Deus (130)

moteto pro čtyřhlasý smíšený sbor a žesťový kvintet

Radostně již z duše celé... (133b)

úprava vánoční mešní písně pro čtyřhlasý smíšený sbor, malý orchestr a varhany

Ecce sacerdos magnus (137)

pro čtyřhlasý smíšený sbor a varhany

Sicut in holocaustis (138)

pro čtyřhlasý smíšený sbor a varhany

Ecce sacerdos magnus (141)

pro čtyřhlasý smíšený sbor a capella

Vesel se nebes Královno (147)

antifona pro dobu velikonoční pro čtyřhlasý smíšený sbor a capella

1940/41

Povzdech k sv. Vojtěchu (154)

sborová píseň pro ženský sbor ze „Tří dvouhlasých sborů“

1944

Male choirs
Joyeux Noël (70)

harmonizace písně ze 16. stol. úprava pro čtyřhlasý mužský sbor

Noëls anciens (70b)

Tři starodávné koledy

pro mužský sbor

vydala Schola Cantorum Paříž

Berceuse (76)

Ukolébavka

pro sóla, sbor a harmonium

Sortie de messe (86)

pro čtyřhlasý mužský sbor a capella

Ave Maria (87)

pro čtyřhlasý mužský sbor a capella

Deux „Tantum ergo“ (88)

pro čtyřhlasý mužský sbor a capella

Lamento (89)

pro čtyřhlasý mužský sbor a capella

Deux motifs moraves (91)

pro čtyřhlasý mužský sbor a capella

La haut l‘astre a relui a Moi je reste vieux garcon (92)

Tam nahoře zazářila hvězda a Já zůstávám starým chlapcem

pro čtyřhlasý mužský sbor a capella

Ave Maria (99)

pro čtyřhlasý mužský sbor a capella

Da Pacem Domine (101)

moteto pro čtyřhlasý mužský sbor a capella

Hi sunt ante thronum Dei (102)

moteto pro čtyřhlasý mužský sbor a capella

O quam suavis (104)

moteto pro čtyřhlasý mužský sbor a capella

Všecka jsi krásná, ó, Maria (110)

pro čtyřhlasý mužský sbor a capella

Tantum ergo (122)

pro čtyřhlasý mužský sbor a capella

Haec dies, quam fecit Dominus (173)

moteto pro čtyřhlasý mužský sbor a capella

Laudete dominum (175b)

moteto pro čtyřhlasý mužský sbor a capella

5× Tantum ergo (214)

Tříkrálové Tantum ergo – pro čtyřhlasý mužský sbor a capella Tantum ergo k Panně Marii Andělské – pro čtyřhlasý smíšený sbor a capella Tantum dorické (Lento) – pro čtyřhlasý mužský sbor a capella Tantum ergo (Moderato) – pro čtyřhlasý smíšený sbor a capella Tantum ergo (Lento) – pro čtyřhlasý mužský sbor a capella

Svatováclavský chorál a fuga (246)

pro mužský a dětský sbor a varhany

Spi, mé Dítě zlaté (291)

úprava pro čtyřhlasý mužský sbor a capella ukolébavka z Vánoční kantáty slova F. Rejl

Tvé oči (309)

pro čtyřhlasý mužský sbor a capella slova F. Rejl

Maria, veď nás (311)

pro čtyřhlasý mužský sbor a capella

Female, children and unisono choirs
Pod ochranu Tvou se utíkáme (108)

pro sbor unisono a varhany

1946

Confirma hoc, Deus (148)

moteto pro čtyřhlasý smíšený sbor a varhany

Confirma hoc, Deus (148)

moteto pro čtyřhlasý smíšený sbor a varhany

Prosba k sv. Vojtěchu (155)

pro čtyřhlasý smíšený sbor a capella ze druhého sborníku mužských sborů

Chorál ženců (156)

pro čtyřhlasý smíšený sbor a capella na slova P. Kleta

Improperium a Píseň k sv. Josefu (160)

pro čtyřhlasý smíšený sbor a varhany

Šest vánočních písní (171)

pět písní pro sólo a varhany, šestá píseň pro čtyřhlasý smíšený sbor a varhany

Tui sunt caeli (198)

Offertorium ad III. Missam in Nativitate Domini

pro čtyřhlasý smíšený sbor a varhany

Panis angelicus (203)

moteto pro čtyřhlasý smíšený sbor a capella

5× Tantum ergo (214)

Tříkrálové Tantum ergo – pro čtyřhlasý mužský sbor a capella Tantum ergo k Panně Marii Andělské – pro čtyřhlasý smíšený sbor a capella Tantum dorické (Lento) – pro čtyřhlasý mužský sbor a capella Tantum ergo (Moderato) – pro čtyřhlasý smíšený sbor a capella Tantum ergo (Lento) – pro čtyřhlasý mužský sbor a capella

Dextera Domini fecit virtutem (215)

moteto pro čtyřhlasý smíšený sbor a capella

I. a II. Tantum ergo (217)

pro čtyřhlasý smíšený sbor a capella

Ad te Domine, levavi (227)

Offertorium I. neděle adventní

moteto pro čtyřhlasý smíšený sbor a capella

Continuo hoc Deus (228)

Offertorium na Boží Hod svatodušní

moteto pro smíšený sbor, žesťový kvintet a varhany

Benedixisti Domine, Terrem tuam (229)

Offertorium na III. adventní neděli

pro smíšený sbor a varhany

Deus, tu convertus (230)

Offertorium na II. adventní neděli

moteto pro smíšený sbor a varhany

Dominabitur a mari in C dur (231a)

Graduale in festo DNJCh Regis

pro smíšený sbor

Dominabitur a mari in fis moll (231b)

Graduale in festo DNJCh Regis

pro smíšený sbor

Exaltate eum (232)

Offertorium pro Missa pro eligendo S. Pontifice

moteto pro smíšený sbor

Lauda anima (233)

Dominica post Pascha

pro smíšený sbor

Non duplices sermonem (234)

pro smíšený sbor a varhany

Precatus est Moyzes (235)

Offertorium XII. neděle post Fent.

pro smíšený sbor a varhany

Sbory k Božímu tělu (236)

Ego sum panis vivus Caro mea O quam suavis O sacrum convivium

pro smíšený sbor

Terra tremuit (237)

pro smíšený sbor

Hospodine, pomiluj ny (238a)

pro smíšený sbor

Zdrávas královno (238b)

pro smíšený sbor

Svatý Václave (238c)

pro smíšený sbor

Tui sunt caeli (239)

F dur

pro smíšený sbor

Ad festum nostri Celsissimi Domini Archiepiscopi Joseph Beran (242)

pro čtyřhlasý smíšený sbor a capella

Angelis suis mandavit dete (274)

moteto pro smíšený sbor a capella

Non participentur sancta (278)

moteto pro čtyřhlasý smíšený sbor a capella

Invokace (280)

pro čtyřhlasý smíšený sbor a capella

Čtyři chvály Krista (294)

pro sóla, smíšený sbor a varhany slova F. Rejl

Tys věčný Král a Bůh náš (296)

pro sóla, smíšený sbor a varhany slova F. Rejl

Pozdravy rodné zemi (303)

I. Pod Zvičinou – sólo zpěv a klavír II. Domov – sólo zpěv a klavír III. Balada o jabloňovém květu – sóla, smíšený sbor a klavír

1947

Decet huius cunctis horis (161)

pro sbor unisono a varhany

Tři vánoční písně (324)

pro ženský dvouhlas

vyšlo v Praporci roku 1949

Entre le boef et l‘ane gris

ženský sbor

1972

Deus firmavit orbem terrae (304)

moteto pro čtyřhlasý smíšený sbor a capella

Trois chansones tchécoslovaques (307)

harmonizace pro čtyřhlasý smíšený sbor a capella

Trois chansones de soldates tchécoslovaques (308)

harmonizace pro smíšený sbor a capella

Regarde-nous d‘en-haut, Notre Mere (317)

pro čtyřhlasý smíšený sbor a capella

Shlédni na nás, Matko naše (317)

čtyřhlasý smíšený sbor a capella

Večerní modlitba (326)

pro čtyřhlasý sbor

Tichy, Otto Albert